The Cambridge University Wireless Society (CUWS) is the amateur radio club of the University of Cambridge, England.

CUWS is one of the oldest still active radio clubs in the United Kingdom. It was founded  on 13 October 1920 and its call sign has since 1932 always been G6UW. The society operates a radio shack outside Cambridge and frequently enters amateur radio contests such as CQWW in both the single-sideband modulation (SSB) and continuous wave (CW) category. The society also holds the call sign M4A for use in certain contests.

Some notable ex-members are Maurice Wilkes and Ernest Rutherford.

DXpeditions 

The Cambridge University Wireless Society regularly organise DX-peditions. Previous trips have included the following locations, among others:
 Faroe Islands
 Iceland
 Isle of Man
 Jersey
 Saint Pierre and Miquelon
 Switzerland
 Tristan da Cunha

References

External links 
 Cambridge University Wireless Society website
 Camb-Hams website

Student organizations established in 1920
Clubs and societies of the University of Cambridge
Radio organisations in the United Kingdom
Amateur radio organizations
Amateur radio history
1920 establishments in England